This is a list of governors of Himachal Pradesh. Sh. Shiv Pratap Shukla  is the 22nd governor (31st if governors with additional charge also counted) of Himachal Pradesh since February 2023. Out of the regular 21 governors (except the present one) of the state only three have been able to complete their full terms: S. Chakravarti (1971–77), Vishnu Sadashiv Kokje (2003–08) and Urmila Singh (2010–15).

Lieutenant governors of Himachal Pradesh

Governors of Himachal Pradesh

See also
 Himachal Pradesh
 Governors of India
 Chief Minister of Himachal Pradesh
 Government of Himachal Pradesh

References

External links
 H.P.Vidhan Sabha-Past Governor's

 
Himachal
Governors